Raoul Rémy (25 October 1919, in Marseille – 22 June 2002, in Marseille) was a French professional road bicycle racer.

Major results

1943
Charlieu
1946
Derby d'Auriolm
1947
Ajaccio
Circuit de l'Indre
La grande Combe
1948
La grande Combe
Paris–Camembert
Tour de France:
Winner stage 5
1949
GP Catox
GP de Guelma
1950
La ciotat
Manosque
Paris-Clermont-Ferrand
Rouen
1951
GP Nice
Nantua
Tour du Vaucluse
1952
Alger
GP de l'Echo d'Oran
Riez
Tour de France:
Winner stage 13
1953
Circuit de l'Haut Savoie
1954
GP de l'Echo d'Oran
1955
Ronde d'Aix-en-Provence
Sète
Montélimar
1957
Barsac

External links 

French male cyclists
1919 births
2002 deaths
French Tour de France stage winners
Cyclists from Marseille